Plant food means fertilizer.
Plant food may also refer to:
Bath salts (drug), which may me mislabeled as "plant food".
Plant-based diet
You're Plant Food!, a Give Yourself Goosebumps book.

See also
Plant & Food Research, an organization based in New Zealand.